Alan Street (born 17 April 1982) is a British former competitive figure skater. He is the 2001 British national champion in men's singles. He competed at four World Junior Championships, achieving his best result, sixth, in 2001 (Sofia, Bulgaria). He also appeared at one senior international, the 2001 European Championships, where he placed 28th. He trained in Blackburn and Ayr.

Programs

Competitive highlights 
JGP: Junior Series / Junior Grand Prix

References

External links
 

1982 births
British male single skaters
Living people
Sportspeople from Bradford